The 1923 Volta a Catalunya was the fifth edition of the Volta a Catalunya cycle race and was held from 31 May to 3 June 1923. The race started and finished in Barcelona. The race was won by Maurice Ville.

Route and stages

General classification

References

1923
Volta
1923 in Spanish road cycling
May 1923 sports events
June 1923 sports events